Fyre Festival was a fraudulent luxury music festival founded by con artist Billy McFarland and rapper Ja Rule. It was created with the intent of promoting the company's Fyre app for booking music talent. The festival was scheduled to take place on April 28–30 and May 5–7, 2017, on the Bahamian island of Great Exuma.

The event was promoted on Instagram by social media influencers including Kendall Jenner, Bella Hadid, Hailey Baldwin and Emily Ratajkowski, many of whom did not initially disclose they had been paid to do so. During the Fyre Festival's inaugural weekend, the event experienced problems related to security, food, accommodation, medical services and artist relations, resulting in the festival being postponed indefinitely – and eventually cancelled. Instead of the luxury villas and gourmet meals for which festival attendees paid hundreds of dollars, they received prepackaged sandwiches and FEMA tents as their accommodation.

In March 2018, McFarland pleaded guilty to one count of wire fraud to defraud investors and ticket holders, and a second count to defraud a ticket vendor that occurred while out on bail. In October 2018, McFarland was sentenced to six years in prison and ordered to forfeit US$26 million. The organizers became the subject of at least eight lawsuits, several seeking class action status, and one seeking more than $100 million in damages. The cases accuse the organizers of defrauding ticket buyers.

Two documentaries about the events of the festival were released in 2019: Hulu's Fyre Fraud, and Netflix's Fyre: The Greatest Party That Never Happened. It was also featured on an episode of the CNBC series American Greed in 2019.

Planning and organization

The festival was organized by Billy McFarland and Ja Rule, to promote the Fyre music booking app. Ja Rule had come to know McFarland through regular visits to events McFarland hosted at his previous venture, Magnises. During a flight to the Bahamas, McFarland and Ja Rule's private plane touched down on a lightly populated island which they later discovered was Norman's Cay, the former private island of Carlos Lehder Rivas, a kingpin of the Medellín Cartel. McFarland then leased the island from the current owners, with the owners giving the strict condition that McFarland make no reference to Pablo Escobar (leader of the Medellín Cartel) in any marketing materials.

Promotional footage with hired supermodels was shot on Norman's Cay, and planning for the festival went ahead. On December 12, 2016, Kendall Jenner, Emily Ratajkowski and other influencers paid by Fyre simultaneously posted to their Instagram feeds a video with a thumbnail consisting of an orange square and a logo made of stylized flames. The video showed Bella Hadid and other models represented by her agency running around a tropical beach. Text with the video promised "an immersive music festival ... two transformative weekends ... on the boundaries of the impossible". This was the beginning of the Fyre Festival's promotional campaign, during which McFarland himself claimed that the island had been owned by Pablo Escobar. The owners cancelled their arrangement with McFarland soon after.

In reality, Pablo Escobar never owned Norman's Cay. When they were kicked off of Norman's Cay, they only had four months before their inaugural festival on April 28–30th. 
After several small islands that seemed like likely venues were turned down, and with only two months to go before the Fyre Festival, the Bahamian government gave McFarland a permit to use a site set aside for development at Roker Point on Great Exuma, just north of the Sandals Resort. Material released on social media continued to promote the falsehood that the festival was being hosted on Pablo Escobar's private island, with maps of the site altered to make it appear as if Roker Point was an island unto itself.

In reality, the festival was in a remote parking lot north of a Sandals Resort and a nearby marina where locals' boats were stored. Furthermore, Great Exuma was not a private or remote island. Instead, the festival was scheduled to take place in an abandoned resort development. McFarland never announced the change; he just simply renamed the island "Fyre Cay". With no infrastructure and no villas, the team had just under two months to turn Roker Point into Fyre Cay.

An investor, fashion executive Carola Jain, reportedly arranged for Fyre to receive a $4 million loan, which the company used most of to rent luxurious offices in Manhattan's Tribeca neighborhood. With no experience staging an event of the proposed festival's scale, McFarland began approaching companies that did, and was reportedly taken aback when informed the event would cost at least $50 million to stage in the time available as he had promised. Furthermore, the more experienced consultants told them that in addition to the cost, an event of this magnitude would have needed an extra year to plan. He and his associates at Fyre believed it would cost far less and continued with their plans under that assumption. The organizers tried to do things themselves where possible; McFarland supposedly learned how to rent the stage by doing a Google Search.

In the days leading up to the festival, they cut expenses extensively, having learned that the luxury villas were going to cost $10 million alone, and targeted deposits for the bands, food, infrastructure and staff.

Customers were promised accommodation in "modern, eco-friendly, geodesic domes" and meals from celebrity chefs. The final advertised lineup was for 33 artists, including Pusha T, Tyga, Desiigner, Blink-182, Major Lazer, Disclosure, Migos, Rae Sremmurd, Kaytranada, Lil Yachty, Matoma, Klingande, Skepta, Claptone, Le Youth, Tensnake, Blond:ish, and Lee Burridge. In the days leading up to the festival, all of the aforementioned acts pulled out, with Major Lazer never confirming their attendance despite being advertised. To make matters worse, organizers of the Fyre Festival planned their first event for April 28–30, the same weekend as the Exuma Regatta, a Bahamian sailing race series that utilized most of the island's hotels, vacation rentals and resources.

While the festival's promotional material kept claiming that the festival would be held on a remote private island that once belonged to drug trafficker Pablo Escobar, workers were busy preparing Roker Point for the festival, scattering sand over its rocks and improving a road to a nearby beach, where they built some cabanas and installed swing seats.

On the mainland, 5,000 tickets had been sold, and an air service was hired to charter festival-goers from Miami. A medical-services company and caterer were also hired, but the latter withdrew a few weeks before the festival. With only two weeks to go, a new catering service with a $1 million total budget was hired, drastically reduced from the $6 million originally allocated to provide for what was promised as "uniquely authentic island cuisine...local seafood, Bahamian-style sushi and even a pig roast".

In March 2017, Fyre also hired a veteran event producer, Yaron Lavi, who saw that it was impossible to hold the sort of event McFarland and Ja Rule envisioned at the site. He assumed they would postpone the event to November as they had been discussing since they were not ready. However, when Fyre told him they would stage the event in the spring anyway, Lavi told them to abandon plans for temporary villas and instead erect tents, the only accommodation that could be delivered in the time remaining. Lavi advised Fyre to make this clear to those who had already bought tickets, as otherwise it would be damaging to their brand. He says the company assured him that an email was being prepared, but he was not sure if it was sent.

Comcast Ventures considered investing $25 million in the Fyre app, which McFarland apparently hoped would allow him to finance the festival, but declined days beforehand. Reportedly, McFarland had valued Fyre Media at $90 million but was unable to provide sufficient proof of that when Comcast requested it.

Writing for New York magazine, one of the event organizers later noted that since at least mid-March there were significant problems with the planning, and at one point it was suggested they reschedule the 2017 festival until 2018.

These plans, however, were revoked at the last minute with the decision to go on with the event as planned. "Let's just do it and be legends, man," one of the organizers is reported to have said. Later that month, Page Six began reporting rumors that the festival organizers were too disorganized and "in over their heads."

After the Comcast deal fell through, McFarland obtained some temporary financing for Fyre through investor Ezra Birnbaum that required the company repay at least US$500,000 of the loan within 16 days.

In order to raise quick cash for the event, and with under two weeks to go before the inaugural event, Fyre informed ticket-holders that the event would now be "cashless (and cardless)," and encouraged attendees to put up thousands of dollars in advance on a digital Fyre Band to cover purchases at the festival, according to one lawsuit. Each attendee would be issued an RFID-equipped, smartwatch-like ID to use during the festival; this was despite warnings that such digital bracelets would be useless because of the poor Wi-Fi connection at the site.

McFarland, who signed the email, suggested that attendees deposit $300–500 for every day they planned to attend. About $2 million from festival goers was taken for these bracelets, 40% of which, according to a lawsuit later filed by Birnbaum, was used by McFarland to pay off the short-term loan.

Festival events and attendee experiences
Early in the morning of April 27, heavy rain fell on Great Exuma, soaking the open tents and mattresses piled out in the open air for guest arrivals later that day.

The first flights from Miami International Airport to Exuma International Airport, operated by Swift Air and Xtra Airways, landed at 6:20a.m. That afternoon, Blink-182 announced that it was withdrawing from the festival, stating in a Twitter post that: "We're not confident that we would have what we need to give you the quality of performances we always give our fans."

Initial arrivals were brought to an "impromptu beach party" at a beachside restaurant, where they were plied with alcohol and kept waiting for around six hours while frantic preparations at the festival site continued. McFarland had hired hundreds of local Bahamian workers to help build the site. Meanwhile, organizers had to renegotiate the guarantees they offered to the people who would be playing at the festival as costs spiraled out of control. Later arrivals were brought directly to the grounds by school bus where the true state of the festival's site became apparent: their accommodations were little more than scattered disaster relief tents with dirt floors, some with mattresses that were soaking wet as a result of the morning rain. The gourmet food accommodations were nothing more than inadequate and poor quality food (including cheese sandwiches served in foam containers).

Festival-goers were dropped off at the production bungalow where McFarland and his team were based so they could be registered, but after hours of waiting in vain, people rushed to claim their own tents. Although there were only about 500 people, there were not enough tents and beds for the guests, so they wound up stealing from others. Attendees were unable to leave the festival for the nearby Sandals resorts as it was peak season, with almost every hotel on Great Exuma already fully booked for the annual Exuma Regatta. Around nightfall, a group of local musicians took to the stage and played for a few hours, the only act to perform at the event. In the early morning, it was announced that the festival would be postponed and that the attendees would be returned to Miami as soon as possible.

Reports from the festival mentioned various other problems, such as the mishandling or theft of guests' baggage, no lighting to help people find their way around, an unfinished gravel lot, a lack of medical personnel or event staff, no cell phone or internet service, insufficient portable toilets, no running water and heavy-handed security. These problems were exacerbated as the festival had been promoted as a cashless event, leaving many attendees without money for taxi fare or other expenses.

Many attendees were reportedly stranded, as flights to and from the island were cancelled after the Bahamian government issued an order that barred any planes from landing at the airport.

The first flight back to Miami boarded at 1:30a.m. on April 28, but was delayed for hours due to issues with the flight's manifest. It was cancelled after sunrise, and passengers were locked in the Exuma Airport terminal with no access to food, water or air conditioning; a passenger recalled that at least one person passed out from the heat and had to be hospitalized.

The flight eventually left Exuma later that morning, and more charter flights to Miami departed from Exuma throughout the day. One attendee who was stuck in Miami reported that the pilot of their airplane had told them to get off so they could turn the plane around for immediate departure, as they were now serving as a rescue aircraft to get attendees off Great Exuma Island.

Involved parties

Organizers
The Washington Post reported that "some of those benefits never materialized or were far from what was advertised". "They send the same email for every problem, but it's like fill-in-the-blanks for what the problem is", a member reported to Business Insider. Magnises reportedly became profitable in 2015.

The Washington Post also reported that McFarland "has a history of overpromising" in his previous business ventures, and cited multiple examples, including McFarland selling VIP tickets to the musical Hamilton for  then cancelling at the last minute. In a complaint to the Better Business Bureau, one customer seeking a refund reported getting no response to multiple queries for over a month and a half.

Celebrity and social media promoters
The event was promoted on Instagram by Kardashian family socialite Kendall Jenner (who was paid $250,000 and has since deleted the post), Bella Hadid, Emily Ratajkowski, Hailey Baldwin, Elsa Hosk, Chanel Iman, Lais Ribeiro, Alessandra Ambrosio, Shanina Shaik, Nadine Leopold, Rose Bertram, Gizele Oliveira, Hannah Ferguson, and other niche-actresses and media personalities. Ratajkowski was reportedly the only actress or model to use the hashtag #ad, but has also since deleted the post. Only later was it reported that Jenner and the others had been paid to make the posts, something they were required under federal law to disclose. The Federal Trade Commission said #ad only worked at the beginning of paid posts, and that the hashtag alone was not a sufficient disclaimer.

Hadid has acknowledged and apologized for participating in the promotion. Baldwin revealed that she donated her entire payment to charity after seeing the aftermath of the event.

FuckJerry and Jerry Media were partially responsible for promotions and social media marketing, and were possibly responsible for the Netflix documentary that neglected to acknowledge their involvement and participation in the event marketing.

Aftermath 
Fyre Festival posted a statement on their website:

Ja Rule posted a note on Twitter that said "I wanted this to be an amazing event it was NOT A SCAM as everyone is reporting; I don't know how everything went so left but I'm working to make it right by making sure everyone is refunded.” He went on to say "I truly apologize as this is NOT MY FAULT… but I'm taking responsibility.”
Many news organizations compared the chaos to William Golding's novel Lord of the Flies and Suzanne Collins's novel The Hunger Games. The Bahamas Ministry of Tourism apologized on behalf of the nation, and denied having any responsibility for how the events unfolded. The workers who constructed the site and the restaurant that provided meals for festival staff were never paid, leading to the restaurant owner appealing for assistance on the crowdfunding platform GoFundMe.

Fyre Festival announced that it would offer all attendees a choice between a full refund or VIP tickets to the following year's festival (which was proposed, but never happened).

Lawsuits 
As a result of the festival, McFarland and Ja Rule are the subject of a $100 million lawsuit in the state of California, with Ja Rule later being dismissed from the lawsuit by the judge in July 2019.  It was filed on behalf of plaintiff Daniel Jung by entertainment lawyer Mark Geragos, who is seeking class action status for the lawsuit with more than 150 plaintiffs. Per the filing, Jung's lawsuit alleges fraud, breach of contract (partly because of the decision by the organizers to make the festival cashless so that attendees didn't bring money for taxis), breach of covenant of good faith (partly due to the inadequate catering and the incident where attendees were locked in the airport) and negligent misrepresentation. Ben Meiselas of Geragos's firm pledged to hold "all those who recklessly and blindly promoted the festival" accountable, which was interpreted as being directed at Jenner, Hadid, and other social media influencers. A Geragos lawyer stated that Fyre Festival sent cease and desist letters to whistleblowers. 

A second class action lawsuit against Fyre Media, McFarland, Ja Rule, and the event promoters identified as "Does 1–100" was filed in Los Angeles by personal injury lawyer John Girardi on behalf of three attendees. The plaintiff alleges that they deceived patrons into attending the festival by paying more than 400 social media personalities and celebrities to promote it. The parties are accused of breach of contract, negligent misrepresentation, and fraud  however this lawsuit was later dismissed. A Bloomberg reporter filed a FOIA request to the FTC regarding their Instagram knowledge, after the second class action lawsuit.

A third lawsuit was filed in New York federal court against Ja Rule, McFarland, Fyre Media, and chief marketing officer Grant Margolin. Plaintiffs Matthew Herlihy and Anthony Lauriello accused the festival organizers of "false representations, material omissions... negligence, fraud, and violations of consumer protection statutes." "Upon the arrival of guests to the island of Great Exuma for the first weekend, the island was lacking basic amenities, was covered in dirt, and guests had to sleep in tents with wet blankets," the suit claims. "There were no communal showers or bathrooms as promised; instead there were porta potties (only about one for every 200 yards) that were knocked down and only three showers although there were hundreds of people arriving." however this lawsuit was dismissed in November 2019 with the judge granted plaintiffs limited leave to replead with respect to particular allegations against Ja Rule.

On May 4, another lawsuit was filed by National Event Services (NES), which provided medical services for the festival and claimed to have suffered $250,000 in damages, alleging breach of contract, fraud, and negligence by the organizers. The suit alleged that Fyre "failed and/or refused" to buy cancellation insurance and "failed to secure a contract with a medical evacuation helicopter or plane." NES employees reported that the local medical clinic was closed and the accommodation was "uninhabitable" with "bug infestation, bloodstained mattresses, and no air conditioning."

Also in May, festival attendee Andrew Petrozziello filed a lawsuit in New Jersey federal court alleging that the organizers violated the state's consumer fraud act and committed breach of contract.

A sixth lawsuit, filed in Florida federal court as a class action suit, alleged violations that include fraud, negligence, and breach of contract. The plaintiffs, Kenneth and Emily Reel, accused the organizers of sending cease and desist letters to people who criticized the festival on social media.

A seventh lawsuit was filed in Manhattan federal court as a class action suit on behalf of Sean Daly and Edward Ivey. In addition to the infractions mentioned in the other lawsuits, this suit alleges unjust enrichment and violation of New York state business law, claiming that the organizers continued to offer VIP upgrades and opportunities to deposit money into the "Fyre Band" payment system after the festival had been canceled.

An eighth lawsuit was filed in Suffolk County Superior Court in Boston on behalf of ticketing vendor Tablelist. The company is alleging that the festival organizers and financial backers committed breach of contract and fraudulently deceived Tablelist and ticket purchasers. Tablelist is seeking $3.5 million to refund customers, as well as damages resulting from loss of business after being forced to lay off 40% of their workforce to focus on the litigation.

On July 3, 2018, two North Carolina attendees, Seth Crossno and Mark Thompson, were awarded $5 million in damages. The judgment was granted against Billy McFarland in absentia after he failed to respond to the court proceedings. Ja Rule was initially named as a co-defendant, but was later removed from the suit after an undisclosed private agreement with the two attendees' attorney.

Ja Rule said in January 2019 that he had also been defrauded by McFarland; in November 2019, he was dismissed from a class action lawsuit filed by festival attendees, the judge determining that it had not been proven his promotion of the festival on social media had directly led to the plaintiffs' attending.

Criminal investigation
On May 21, 2017, The New York Times reported McFarland and his associates were under an active federal criminal investigation by the Federal Bureau of Investigation for mail fraud, wire fraud, and securities fraud. The case was overseen by the United States Attorney for the Southern District of New York. On June 30, 2017, McFarland was arrested and charged with one count of wire fraud.

In March 2018, McFarland pleaded guilty to one count of wire fraud in what the U.S. Justice Department called a scheme to defraud investors, as well as a second count of wire fraud related to a scheme to defraud a ticket vendor. In October 2018, McFarland was sentenced to six years in prison and ordered to forfeit US$26 million.

On July 24, 2018, the Securities and Exchange Commission (SEC) announced that McFarland, two companies he founded, a former senior executive, and a former contractor agreed to settle charges arising out of an extensive, multi-year offering fraud that raised at least $27.4 million from over 100 investors. McFarland admitted to the SEC's allegations against him, agreed to a permanent director-and-officer bar, and agreed to disgorgement of $27.4 million. Grant H. Margolin, Daniel Simon, Fyre Media, and Magnises, Inc. agreed to the settlement without admitting or denying the charges. Margolin has agreed to a seven-year director-and-officer bar and must pay a $35,000 penalty, and Simon has agreed to a three-year director-and-officer bar and must pay over $15,000 in disgorgement and penalty. The settlements are subject to court approval.

Compensation
Like other Bahamian suppliers, the caterer who worked on the event was not paid; in 2019 a crowdfunding appeal raised over $200,000 to compensate her. In 2020 the United States Marshals Service auctioned Fyre Festival-branded merchandise that McFarland had kept for future sale, with the proceeds to go to victims.

Films
In 2019, two documentary films were released that covered the Fyre Festival and McFarland.

Fyre Fraud, directed by Jenner Furst and Julia Willoughby Nason, premiered on Hulu on January 14, 2019. On the review aggregation website Rotten Tomatoes, the film holds a 79% approval rating with an average rating of 6.41 out of 10, based on 28 reviews. Metacritic, which uses a weighted average, assigned the film a score of 66 out of 100, based on 12 critic reviews, indicating "generally favorable reviews."

Fyre, directed by Chris Smith, was released by Netflix on January 18, 2019. Like Fyre Fraud, the film received positive reviews. On Rotten Tomatoes, the film holds a 90% rating with an average rating of 7.54 out of 10, based on 73 reviews. On Metacritic, the film holds a score of 76 out of 100, based on 26 critic reviews, indicating "generally favorable reviews."

In popular culture 

In a 2017 tweet, Seth Rogen stated that The Lonely Island comedy trio were planning a movie about a failed music festival. In 2019, Jorma Taccone confirmed that the parody film was still in process.

In 2018, American punk band Alkaline Trio – whose singer and guitarist Matt Skiba also played in Blink-182 at the time, who were among the first acts to cancel their planned performance at the festival – released the song "Goodbye Fire Island", which was inspired by Blink-182's involvement with the festival.

In 2019, Ryan Reynolds featured Andy King and his signature quote from the Fyre documentary in an advertisement for his gin brand.

In 2019, HBO's Silicon Valley depicted RussFest, a music event in the desert with similarities to the real-life Fyre Festival. A 2016 Silicon Valley episode from season 3 depicts a lavish Hawaiian-themed party on Alcatraz by a newly-formed company that goes bankrupt.

In 2019, All Elite Wrestling released a pay-per-view parodying the failed music festival called Fyter Fest. In the Buy-In pre-show, QT Marshall parodied Andy King's Évian story while Kenny Omega was told Blink-182 wasn't coming to perform, referencing their refusal to perform due to the failure of Fyre.

In 2019, the show Brooklyn Nine-Nine referenced the Fyre festival, with villainous character The Vulture claiming to be “friends with the Fyre festival guy” as a part of setting up his character. He also claims to be making a documentary on the issue “placing the blame where it clearly belongs; on the island people” to the annoyance of the rest of the squad.

In the 2020 video game Maneater, there are collectibles in the form of "landmarks" for the player to find. One of the landmarks, titled "Fyre Sale", parodies the failed festival, with the narrator (voiced by Chris Parnell) stating, "People paid over twelve thousand dollars to sleep [in tents] and listen to Swedish DJs for an entire weekend."

See also
List of historic rock festivals
List of music festivals
Woodstock 1999
Woodstock 50

References

External links
Official website at the Internet Archive

2017 in the Bahamas
2017 music festivals
2017 scandals
April 2017 events in North America
Cancelled music festivals
Corporate scandals